Tiaro  is a rural town and locality in the Fraser Coast Region, Queensland, Australia.

Geography 
The town is on the Mary River.

Timber and farming are the predominant industries in the Tiaro area, although the town's position on Queensland's main coastal highway also brings economic benefits.

History

The town takes its name from the pastoral run name in the 1840s. It is believed to be a corruption of the Kabi word (Dauwabra dialect) meaning dead trees.
The Tiaro War Memorial commemorates those who served in World War I. It was unveiled on 25 April 1921 (ANZAC Day) by Sir Thomas William Glasgow.

Tiaro had one of the first butter factories in Queensland. Baron Jones built the factory near the railway station in the early 1880s and used horses to churn butter. Cheese factories were built at Tiaro in 1890 and 1894. The Tiaro Butter Factory was closed temporarily on the 1st of July 1897 due to a short supply of milk. The Maryborough Chronicle cites “On the whole the season has been fairly good, but the supply very short for a district like Tiaro. This, however, was principally owing to the winter last year being so severe, also the year before, when great numbers of milking cows died, and last spring being so dry”. Although it opened again, it struggled to make a profit. The factory was later relocated to Murgon in 1913 as most of the cream suppliers came from that district.

The Tiaro library opened in 2006.

Education 
Tiaro State School is a government primary (Prep-6) school for boys and girls at 1 Forgan Terrace. In 2017, the school had an enrolment of 31 students with  4 teachers (3 full-time equivalent) and 5 non-teaching staff (3 full-time equivalent).

Amenities 
The Fraser Coast Regional Council operates a public library at Forgan Terrace.  Public accessible wifi is provided.  Current Library services and collections are provided on the Fraser Coast Regional Libraries website.

The Tiaro branch of the Queensland Country Women's Association meets at its rooms at 35 Mayne Street.

Notable residents
 Thomas William Glasgow was born in Tiaro

See also

 Tiaro railway station

References

External links

 Tiaro Shire: Queensland Places
 Town map of Tiaro, 1981
 Tiaro cemetery

Towns in Queensland
Wide Bay–Burnett
Fraser Coast Region
Localities in Queensland